El Palmar National Park (in Spanish, Parque Nacional El Palmar) is one of Argentina's national parks, located on the center-east of the province of Entre Ríos, midway between the cities of Colón (54 km) and Concordia (60 km). It has an area of about 85 km2 and was created in 1966 for the preservation of its characteristic yatay palm trees (Butia yatay, formerly Syagrus yatay).

The park has a temperate-humid savanna ecosystem, typical of the Argentine Mesopotamia. The terrain features patches of palm trees of several species, grassland, small woods and forest, interrupted by streams flowing east into the Uruguay River. The local fauna includes woodpeckers, ñandús, foxes, viscachas, and capybaras.

References

Sources
El Palmar National Park (in Spanish)
Site about El Palmar National Park (in Spanish)
Park description (in Spanish)
El Palmar Photographic Tour

External links

National parks of Argentina
Protected areas of Entre Ríos Province
Uruguay River
Protected areas established in 1966
Ramsar sites in Argentina